Thomas Brindle (1878 – 19 November 1950) was a New Zealand activist for the New Zealand Labour Party who was jailed during World War I for speaking out against conscription. He was a member of Wellington City Council and stood for election to the House of Representatives five times. He was a member of the Legislative Council from 1936 until March 1950.

Early life in England
Brindle was born in Manchester, Lancashire, England, in 1878. In England, he was active in the Independent Labour Party.

Political career
Brindle emigrated to New Zealand in 1910 or 1912, and he became active with the Social Democratic Party (SDP). He was jailed in 1916 during World War I for speaking out against conscription. In 1918 he was nominated by the SDP for the Labour nomination in the Wellington South by-election, but was defeated by Bob Semple. He stood for secretaryship of the New Zealand Labour Party in 1919, but withdrew and Michael Joseph Savage became the first full-time paid secretary. Brindle stood again in 1920, but lost the ballot. From 1922 to 1926, he was the 6th President of the Labour Party.

Brindle unsuccessfully stood five times for the House of Representatives. In , he was one of three candidates in the  electorate, and he again came last.

Brindle was first elected to Wellington City Council in 1933 after standing unsuccessfully several times prior and remained on the city council until 1941, the same year all Labour local body members in Wellington lost their seats. He was also a member of the Wellington Fire Board. He was appointed to the Legislative Council by the First Labour Government under Michael Joseph Savage and was one of 14 new appointments. At the time of his appointment, he lived in Wellington.

In 1935, he was awarded the King George V Silver Jubilee Medal.

Brindle was a member of the New Zealand Legislative Council from 9 March 1936 to 8 March 1943; and 9 March 1943 to 8 March 1950.

Death
Brindle died on 19 November 1950 at his home in Ōtaki.

Notes

References 

1878 births
1950 deaths
English emigrants to New Zealand
Members of the New Zealand Legislative Council
New Zealand Labour Party MLCs
New Zealand anti–World War I activists
New Zealand politicians convicted of crimes
Politicians from Manchester
Politicians from Wellington City
Social Democratic Party (New Zealand) politicians
Unsuccessful candidates in the 1919 New Zealand general election
Unsuccessful candidates in the 1922 New Zealand general election
Unsuccessful candidates in the 1925 New Zealand general election
Unsuccessful candidates in the 1928 New Zealand general election
Unsuccessful candidates in the 1931 New Zealand general election
Wellington City Councillors